Curt Görans was a dansband from Eskilstuna, Sweden, scoring mid 1970s Svensktoppen chart successes.

Svensktoppen songs
Dansa dansa dansa - 1974
Min sommardröm - 1975
Ta min hand - 1977
Välkommen sommar - 1977

References 

Dansbands
Swedish musical groups
Södermanland County